Gangarampur Government Polytechnic is a Government Polytechnic College located in Kadighat, Gangarampur of Dakshin Dinajpur district in West Bengal. Established in 2013. This Polytechnic College is affiliated to the West Bengal State Council of Technical Education,  and recognised by All India Council for Technical Education This polytechnic offers diploma courses in Automobile, Mechanical  and Civil Engineering.

References

Universities and colleges in Dakshin Dinajpur district
Gangarampur
Educational institutions established in 2013
2013 establishments in West Bengal
Technical universities and colleges in West Bengal